Jeramie Richardson (born December 6, 1983) is a professional American football fullback who is currently a free agent. He played collegic ball at Angelo State University.

Professional career

San Angelo Stampede Express
In 2010, he was a member of the San Angelo Stampede Express of the Indoor Football League.

Utah Blaze
In 2011, he was a member of the Utah Blaze.

West Texas Roughnecks
West Texas Roughnecks where he was named second team All-IFL.

Cleveland Gladiators
In 2012, he was a member of the Cleveland Gladiators.

Orlando Predators
Richardson was assigned to the Orlando Predators in 2013, but he reassigned after the Predators 0–5 start.

New Orleans VooDoo
Richardson was assigned to the New Orleans VooDoo before Week 6 of the 2013 season.

San Antonio Talons
Richardson was assigned to the San Antonio Talons on January 30, 2014.

Cleveland Gladiators
Richardson was assigned to the Cleveland Gladiators on March 21. 2015. On November 6, 2015, Richardson was placed on reassignment.

Philadelphia Soul
On December 8, 2015, Richardson was assigned to the Philadelphia Soul.

Cleveland Gladiators
On May 18, 2017, Richardson was assigned to the Cleveland Gladiators. He earned Second Team All-Arena honors in 2017.

Philadelphia Soul
On March 23, 2018, Richardson was assigned to the Philadelphia Soul.

Albany Empire
On March 14, 2019, Richardson was assigned to the Albany Empire

References

1983 births
Living people
American football fullbacks
American football defensive linemen
American football linebackers
Angelo State Rams football players
Utah Blaze players
San Angelo Stampede Express players
Odessa Roughnecks players
Cleveland Gladiators players
Orlando Predators players
New Orleans VooDoo players
San Antonio Talons players
Philadelphia Soul players
Players of American football from San Antonio
Albany Empire (AFL) players